Bardoli railway station is a railway station in Surat district of Gujarat state of India. It serves Bardoli town. It is under Mumbai WR railway division of Western Railway Zone of Indian Railways. Bardoli railway station is 31 km away from Surat railway station. It is located on Udhna – Jalgaon main line of the Indian Railways.

It is located at 35 m above sea level and has one platform. As of 2016, electrified double broad-gauge railway line exists at this station. Passenger, MEMU, and one Superfast trains halt here.

Major trains

The following trains halt at Bardoli railway station in both directions:

 12834/33 Howrah Ahmedabad Superfast Express
 19003/04 Bandra Terminus–Bhusaval Khandesh Express

See also
Surat railway station
Surat district
List of tourist attractions in Surat

References

Railway stations in Surat district
Mumbai WR railway division
Buildings and structures in Surat